This is a list of members elected to the Irish House of Commons in 1661. The parliament sat until 1666 and consisted of almost 300 MPs at a time during this period.

References
 

661